Jay Cooke Junior High School is a historic junior high school building located in the Logan neighborhood of Philadelphia, Pennsylvania.  It was designed by Irwin T. Catharine and built in 1922–1924.  It is a three-story, 17 bay, brick building on a raised basement in the Colonial Revival-style.  It features a projecting center entrance pavilion, stone pilasters, arched entrance openings, and a brick parapet.  It was named for financier Jay Cooke (1821-1905).

It was added to the National Register of Historic Places in 1988.

References

School buildings on the National Register of Historic Places in Philadelphia
Colonial Revival architecture in Pennsylvania
School buildings completed in 1924
Logan, Philadelphia
1924 establishments in Pennsylvania